Mark Staunton (born 30 January 1989 in Alexandria) is a Scottish footballer who is currently without a club after leaving Stirling Albion in August 2015. He got married in a lavish ceremony in 2017 to an ex model.

Club career
Staunton began his career with Celtic, playing in the under-19 youth team. He left Celtic to join Charlton Athletic in July 2006, with the London club - who paid £110,000 - having kept tabs on him for nearly a year previously. Staunton left Charlton to join Falkirk in August 2007 but was sent to Berwick Rangers on loan for the rest of the season in December 2007, with Falkirk manager John Hughes admitting he was "concerned about his lack of games." Mark was released by Falkirk on 27 June 2009.

On 23 July 2009, Staunton joined Scottish Second Division side East Fife. He was released at the end of the 2009/10 season, when he moved to junior side Beith.

Staunton returned to senior football in the 2012 summer transfer window, when he signed for Stranraer.

On 21 June 2013, Staunton returned to junior football, signing for Irvine Meadow XI F.C.

On 15 June 2015, Staunton signed for Stirling Albion. After just two months at the club, on 18 August 2015, he left Stirling Albion after asking to be released from his contract.

International career
Staunton has been an unused member of Scotland under-19 squad, previously playing at national under-16 and under-17 level.{{

References

External links
 

1989 births
Living people
People from Alexandria, West Dunbartonshire
Footballers from West Dunbartonshire
Scottish footballers
Celtic F.C. players
Charlton Athletic F.C. players
Falkirk F.C. players
Berwick Rangers F.C. players
East Fife F.C. players
Beith Juniors F.C. players
Stranraer F.C. players
Irvine Meadow XI F.C. players
Stirling Albion F.C. players
Scottish Football League players
Scottish Professional Football League players
Association football defenders
Association football forwards
Scottish Junior Football Association players
Scotland youth international footballers